Barnham Broom is a village and civil parish in the English county of Norfolk. The village is situated on the River Yare, 9 miles (15 km) West of Norwich. and 4 miles (6 km) North-West of Wymondham.

The villages name means 'Beorn's homestead/village' or perhaps, 'warrior's homestead/village'. The 'Broom' part was added in 1838.

The civil parish has an area of 7.24 km2 and in the 2001 census had a population of 552 in 220 households, increasing to 590 at the 2011 Census.  For the purposes of local government, the parish falls within the district of South Norfolk.

At the centre of the village, on the crossroads, lies Barnham Broom Post Office & Stores, providing local services to the community and visitors, and a hundred yards further along Bell Road can be found The Bell public house.

The school, Barnham Broom CofE VA Primary School, is an 1847 flint building.

The Parish Council is made up of 7 Councillors and meets on the third Thursday of every month except August and December.

 NE of the village is Barnham Broom Hotel & Country Club, incorporating restaurant, two 18 hole golf courses, a leisure & fitness club and a hotel.

War Memorial
Barnham Broom's War Memorial is located inside St. Peter & St. Paul's Church alongside a Roll of Honour. It lists the following names for the First World War:
 Corporal Charles A. Davey (1895-1918), 4th Battalion, Australian Light Trench Mortar Battery
 Lance-Corporal Ted Pegnall (d.1918), 6th Battalion, Northamptonshire Regiment
 Gunner H. William Cullum (1895-1917), 154th Siege Battery, Royal Garrison Artillery
 Private William R. Waters (1899-1917), 10th Battalion, East Surrey Regiment
 Private Charles Bell (1885-1917), 10th Battalion, Royal Fusiliers
 Private Harry Harvey (1887-1917), 1st Battalion, Royal Norfolk Regiment
 Private Charles Bullard (1892-1918), 13th Battalion, Northumberland Fusiliers
 Private George H. Martin (1888-1917), 24th (Tyneside Irish) Battalion, Northumberland Fusiliers

References

 Ordnance Survey (1999). OS Explorer Map 237 - Norwich. .
 Office for National Statistics & Norfolk County Council (2001). Census population and household counts for unparished urban areas and all parishes. Retrieved 2 December 2005.
 http://kepn.nottingham.ac.uk/map/place/Norfolk/Barnham%20Broom

External links

Barnham Broom Parish Council
Information from Genuki Norfolk on Barnham Broom.
 
Barnham Broom Post Office & Stores

 
Villages in Norfolk
Civil parishes in Norfolk
South Norfolk